Jessica "Jess" Lourey (born 1970) is an American author of crime, young adult, and magic realism novels, children's books, and nonfiction books. She's an Amazon Charts bestselling, Anthony and ITW Thriller Award-winning author who's also been shortlisted for an Edgar, Agatha, Lefty, and Minnesota Book Award.

Biography 
Lourey was born in 1970, in Tacoma, Washington and presently lives in Minneapolis, Minnesota. She has two children. Her husband, Jay, died of suicide shortly after their wedding, which prompted her creative writing career.

In August 2016, she presented at the TEDxRapidCity event, where she "explores how everyone, not just authors, can use the power of fiction to transform."

Lourey has received a Master of Arts and Master of Science degree. As of 2021, she taught at St. Cloud Technical and Community College for 11 years in the college's Liberal Arts division. There, she received The Loft’s Excellence in Teaching fellowship. She retired from teaching in August 2021 to pursue writing full-time.

In addition to writing novels, Lourey is a blogger for Psychology Today and hosts writing workshops.

Awards and honors 
Lourey has received a grant from the Lake Region Arts Council.

In October 2019, Lourey's Mira James Mysteries Fall Bundle, which includes September Mourn, October Fest, and November Hunt, landed on Apple Books' US Bestseller List for Mysteries & Thrillers. In January 2022, the Summer Bundle, which includes June Bug, Knee High by the Fourth of July, and August Moon, landed on the same list.

Lourey's book Unspeakable Things spent eight weeks on the Amazon Charts bestsellers list.

Publications

Adult fiction

Standalone novels 

 Unspeakable Things (2020)
 Bloodline (2021)
 Litani (2021)
 The Quarry Girls (2022)

Reed and Steinbeck thrillers 

 The Taken Ones (2023)

The Catalain Book of Secrets series 

 The Catalain Book of Secrets (2014)
 Seven Daughters (2014)

Murder by Month Romcom Mystery series 

 May Day (2006)
 June Bug (2007)
 Knee High by the Fourth of July (2007)
 August Moon (2008)
 September Mourn (2009)
 October Fest (2011)
 November Hunt (2012)
 December Dread (2012)
 January Thaw (2014)
 February Fever (2015)
 March of Crime (2017)
 April Fools (2019)
 Monday Is Murder (2022 novella)

Salem's Cipher thrillers 

 Salem's Cipher (2019)
 Mercy's Chase (2019)

Children's books 

 Leave My Book Alone! (2021)

Short stories 

 Death by Potato Salad: A Murder-by-the Minute Short Story Featuring Mrs. Berns (2014 Murder by Month Romcom short)
 Give Her a Hand: A Short Story (2014)
 The Adventure of the First Problem (2016 Salem's Cipher short)
 Catch Her in a Lie, part of the Getaway series by multiple authors (2022)

Young adult novels 

 The Toadhouse Trilogy (2012)

Nonfiction 

 Rewrite Your Life: Discover Your Truth Through the Healing Power of Fiction (2017)

References

External links 
 Official website

1970 births
21st-century American women writers
21st-century American novelists
American children's writers
21st-century American non-fiction writers
People from Tacoma, Washington
Living people